Ryne Thomas Stanek (born July 26, 1991) is an American professional baseball pitcher for the Houston Astros of Major League Baseball (MLB). He attended the University of Arkansas, where he played for the Arkansas Razorbacks baseball team. He was selected by the Rays in the first round of the 2013 MLB draft. He made his MLB debut in 2017. He previously played for the Tampa Bay Rays and Miami Marlins. Stanek often appeared as an opener, before the Rays traded him to the Marlins in 2019.

Amateur career

Stanek attended Blue Valley High School in Stilwell, Kansas. As a senior, Stanek pitched to a 5–1 win–loss record, a 0.72 earned run average (ERA), and 71 strikeouts. Out of high school, Baseball America ranked Stanek as the 42nd best available player in the 2010 Major League Baseball Draft. The Seattle Mariners selected Stanek in the third round, with the 99th overall selection, but he did not sign.

Stanek then enrolled at the University of Arkansas to play college baseball for the Arkansas Razorbacks baseball team. In 2011, he played collegiate summer baseball with the Bourne Braves of the Cape Cod Baseball League. As a sophomore in 2012, Stanek pitched to an 8–4 win–loss record with a 2.82 ERA and 83 strikeouts in  innings pitched. He was named to the All-Tournament Team in the 2012 Houston College Classic. That summer, he played with the United States collegiate national baseball team.

Prior to the 2013 season, Stanek was named a pre-season All-American by Baseball America, Perfect Game, and Collegiate Baseball, and the Southeastern Conference (SEC) Pre-season Pitcher of the Year. On March 25, 2013, Stanek was named the SEC Pitcher of the Week. He finished his junior year with a 10–2 record, a 1.39 ERA, 79 strikeouts, and 41 walks in  innings. In his three years at Arkansas, he compiled a 22–8 record and a 2.55 ERA, with a batting average against of .216.

Professional career

Minor league career 
Stanek was considered one of the top available prospects in the 2013 MLB Draft, and was selected by the Tampa Bay Rays with the 29th pick in the first round. Stanek signed with the Rays for a $1,758,300 signing bonus. He did not pitch professionally after he signed, and had surgery on his right acetabular labrum during the 2013–14 offseason, and missed the start of the 2014 season. He made his professional debut with the Bowling Green Hot Rods of the Class A Midwest League on May 8, 2014. After pitching to a 3–4 record and a 3.63 ERA for Bowling Green, the Rays promoted Stanek to the Charlotte Stone Crabs of the Class A-Advanced Florida State League in July.

Stanek began the 2015 season with Charlotte, and was later promoted to the Montgomery Biscuits of the Class AA Southern League. Stanek finished 2015 with a combined 8–5 record with a 3.04 ERA between the two clubs. He returned to Montgomery in 2016, and later joined the Durham Bulls of the Class AAA International League; he posted a combined 4–10 record with a 4.30 ERA between Montgomery and Durham. He was named to appear in the 2016 All-Star Futures Game. The Rays added him to their 40-man roster after the season.

Tampa Bay Rays 
The Rays promoted Stanek to the major leagues on May 13, 2017. He made his major league debut the next day. He ended the 2017 season with a 5.85 ERA in 21 appearances.

In 2018, Stanek found a niche spot working as "the opener", where he found immediate success with his high 90s fastball and newly introduced splitter. In June, Stanek technically set an MLB record by throwing seven consecutive scoreless starts. However, he pitched a mere  innings across those seven starts. Stanek also set a major league record with 17 straight starts allowing one run or fewer. On September 5, Stanek became the first rookie in 75 years to start in back-to-back games. For the majority of the season, Stanek was used as one of the Rays' "opening" starters, making 59 total appearances (29 starts). In  innings, he struck out 81 batters and recorded a 2.98 ERA.

The following season, the Rays continued using Stanek as an opener. Stanek hit the disabled list on July 20, 2019 with a hip injury. He had appeared in 41 games, 27 starts in  innings.

Miami Marlins
On July 31, 2019, the Rays traded Stanek and Jesús Sánchez to the Miami Marlins in exchange for Nick Anderson and Trevor Richards. On August 4, 2020, Stanek was placed on the injured list after contracting COVID-19 and returned a month later on September 4. On the year, Stanek pitched to a 7.20 ERA in nine relief appearances for the Marlins. On December 2, 2020, Stanek was non-tendered by the Marlins.

Houston Astros
On January 7, 2021, Stanek signed a 1-year, $1.1 million contract with the Houston Astros.  For the 2021 season, he talled a 3–5 won–loss record, two saves, and a 3.42 ERA over 72 relief appearances (4th in the AL).

Stanek avoided arbitration with the Astros on March 22, 2022, agreeing to a $2.1 million contract for the season.  He earned his first save of the season on April 27 versus the Texas Rangers, allowing one run one in the ninth and leaving runners stranded on second and third to close out a 4–3 win.   After entering the July 22 contest versus the Seattle Mariners with the bases loaded and tying run aboard, Stanek closed out the inning en route to a 5–2 Astros win and extended a personal scoreless inning streak to 27.  Stanek produced 10 straight scoreless appearances until September 25, 2022, when the Baltimore Orioles scored a run in the eighth inning.  In the 2022 season finale versus the Philadelphia Phillies, Stanek pitched a clean seventh to lower his ERA to 1.15, eclipsing the single-season franchise record for relievers set by Will Harris in 2019 (1.50).

In 2022, Stanek also totaled 2–1 W–L with one save in  innings over 59 relief appearances.  The Astros advanced to the World Series and defeated the Phillies in six games to give Stanek his first career World Series title.

On January 13, 2023, Stanek agreed to a one-year, $3.6 million contract with the Astros, avoiding salary arbitration.

Scouting report 
Stanek throws a 4-seam fastball which stays in the high 90s and low hundreds, and a slider which is in the high 80s and low 90s.

Personal life
Stanek is named after former MLB player, coach, and manager Ryne Sandberg. Stanek is married to Survivor: David vs Goliath contestant Jessica Peet.

See also

 List of University of Arkansas people

References

External links

1991 births
Living people
Sportspeople from Overland Park, Kansas
Baseball players from Kansas
Major League Baseball pitchers
Tampa Bay Rays players
Miami Marlins players
Houston Astros players
Arkansas Razorbacks baseball players
Bourne Braves players
Bowling Green Hot Rods players
Charlotte Stone Crabs players
Gulf Coast Rays players
Montgomery Biscuits players
Durham Bulls players